Houtan, formerly Pujiang Yaohua Station, is a station on Line 7 of the Shanghai Metro. It opened in April 2010, 3 months later than the rest of the stations on the line.

The station is located in Pudong New Area and was one of the stations that was a part of the Expo 2010 zone.

Railway stations in Shanghai
Line 7, Shanghai Metro
Shanghai Metro stations in Pudong
Railway stations in China opened in 2010